Zaliznychne may refer to the following places in Ukraine:

Zaliznychne, Dnipropetrovsk Oblast
Zaliznychne, Vinnytsia Oblast
Zaliznychne, Zaporizhzhia Oblast

The name means 'railway'. A similar Russian name is Zheleznodorozhny (disambiguation).